Acyl-homoserine-lactone synthase is an enzyme with systematic name acyl-(acyl-carrier protein):S-adenosyl-L-methionine acyltranserase (lactone-forming, methylthioadenosine-releasing). This enzyme catalyses the following chemical reaction

 acyl-[acyl-carrier protein] + S-adenosyl-L-methionine  [acyl-carrier protein] + S-methyl-5'-thioadenosine + N-acyl-L-homoserine lactone

Acyl-homoserine lactones (AHLs) are produced by a number of bacterial species and are used by them to regulate the expression of virulence genes in a process known as quorum-sensing.

Alternate names 
acyl-homoserine lactone synthase, acyl homoserine lactone synthase, acyl-homoserinelactone synthase, acylhomoserine lactone synthase, AHL synthase, AHS, AHSL synthase, AhyI, AinS, AinS protein, autoinducer synthase, autoinducer synthesis protein rhlI, EsaI, ExpISCC1, ExpISCC3065, LasI, LasR, LuxI, LuxI protein, LuxM, N-acyl homoserine lactone synthase, RhlI, YspI, acyl-[acyl carrier protein]:S-adenosyl-L-methionine acyltranserase (lactone-forming, methylthioadenosine-releasing)

References

External links 
 

EC 2.3.1